Harun al Raschid  is a 1924 Austrian film directed by Michael Curtiz.

External links

1924 films
Films directed by Michael Curtiz
Austrian silent feature films
Austrian black-and-white films